Edwin Gaines Fullinwider (December 11, 1900–February 8, 1982) was an American sabre fencer. He competed at the 1920 and 1924 Summer Olympics.

References

External links 
 Fullinwider, Edwin Gaines at the Arlington National Cemetery
 Edwin Gaines Fullinwider in the 1921 Lucky Bag of the United States Naval Academy
 

1900 births
1982 deaths
American male sabre fencers
Olympic fencers of the United States
Fencers at the 1920 Summer Olympics
Fencers at the 1924 Summer Olympics
People from Raton, New Mexico